Walham Green is the historic name of an English village, now part of inner London, in the parish of Fulham in the County of Middlesex. It was located between the hamlet of North End (now renamed West Kensington) to the north, and Parsons Green to the south.<ref>{{cite book|last=Walford|first=Edward|title=Fulham: Walham Green and North End, in Old and New London: Volume 6|location=London|date=1878|pages=21–528|publisher=British History Online|url=http://www.british-history.ac.uk/old-new-london/vol6/pp521-528|access-date=23 October 2016}}</ref> To the east it was bounded by Counter's Creek, the historical boundary with the parish of Chelsea, and to the south-east is Sands End. 

Within the area is the old athletics stadium of Stamford Bridge, now home to Chelsea F.C.

History
In the 19th century Counter's Creek became the Kensington Canal, soon to be replaced by the West London Railway, and Walham Green acquired its own parish church of St John in 1828 on the site of the village pond. With the arrival of the District Railway and urbanisation, the heart of Fulham shifted from its centuries-old All Saints parish church on the Thames and the area of Fulham High Street to Walham Green, the centre of which was subsequently renamed Fulham Broadway. From 1880 to 1952 Fulham Broadway tube station was called Walham Green. All that remains of the village's former identity is the tree-lined street called 'Walham Grove'.

Walham Green has a history of brewing dating back to 1765. The Swan Brewery (and its associated inn) was located about 50 yards south-east of St John's Church on what is now Fulham Broadway. The Stocken family were brewers here for many years. In 1880 the Swan Brewery (now run by Messrs Stansfeld & Co) was relocated to 3 acres of land next to Eel Brook Common, just off the Fulham Road, set back behind the houses between Cassidy Road and Shottendane Road. The new brewery was a stylish affair, as was typical of the mid-Victorian era, even the 130 foot chimney was ornate. The brewery stopped brewing in 1928, and was closed shortly afterwards. The site was cleared, and the chimney demolished in 1930. The site of the brewery is now the location of Fulham Court.

Fulham BroadwayFulham Broadway denotes a section of the Fulham Road within the London Borough of Hammersmith and Fulham which contains the former Grade II listed Fulham Town Hall, the eponymous underground station and the intersection with the busy commercial thoroughfare that is North End Road and Harwood Road. A triangle – by the bus turning alley, with an office block on it – is the site of Frank Matcham's old Granville Theatre'', which closed in 1971. Fulham Broadway also refers to the area in the immediate vicinity of the station which is now set inside a shopping mall with a cinema complex, and the pedestrianised streets by St John's church, which offer a host of restaurants, pubs, cafés and small shops, including a printers. The Royal Mail sorting office is nearby as are four supermarkets, one of them large with a car park and one that specialises in organic produce.

The rest of Walham Green village has been subsumed in several conservation areas and is today considered a desirable place to live for young professionals and Chelsea 'overspill'. Residents have included Gloria Hunniford and Loyd Grossman. Nearby attractions include Parson's Green, the bars, clubs and restaurants of the New King's Road and Chelsea Harbour.

Nearest stations 
 Fulham Broadway tube station
 West Brompton station
 West Kensington tube station
 Barons Court tube station
 Parsons Green tube station
 Imperial Wharf railway station

References

External links 
 Walham Green, Hammersmith & Fulham

Areas of London
Fulham
History of the London Borough of Hammersmith and Fulham
Districts of the London Borough of Hammersmith and Fulham
Places formerly in Middlesex